Claudiana Ibijoke Sanwo-Olu (née Carrena; born 8 January 1967) is the first lady of Lagos State in Nigeria, as the spouse of the governor of Lagos State Babajide Sanwo-Olu.

Early life 
Claudiana Ibijoke Carrena was born in 1967 in the Lagos Island neighborhood of Popo Aguda, the daughter of Paulinus Olusegun Carrena. Like most residents of the historic neighborhood, the Carrena family are Brazilian descendants.

Career
Sanwo-Olu graduated from the University of Lagos Akoka, Yaba campus, with an MBBS and went on to earn a post-graduate diploma in Hospital and Health Management (PGDHM) as well as a Diploma in Anesthesia (DA). She also has a master's degree in public health (MPH) and a master's degree in business administration (MBA).

Ibijoke Sanwo-Olu worked for the Lagos State Government for 25 years, rising through the ranks of medicine to become the Chief Medical Director and Chief Executive Officer at Harvey Road Comprehensive Health Centre in Yaba, before being transferred to the General Hospital in Somolu.

She is also a women and children advocate.

Personal life 
Dr. Ibijoke Sanwo-Olu is married to Babajide Olusola Sanwo-Olu.

See also 
 Abimbola Fashola
 Bolanle Ambode
 List of first ladies of Nigerian states

References

Living people
Nigerian people of Brazilian descent
First Ladies of Lagos State
1967 births